The 1965 Oxford-Cambridge rugby union tour of Argentina was a series of matches played in Argentina, in Buenos Aires and Rosario, and in Brazil in 1965.

A mixed selection, formed also of many international players of the England national team, students at  Oxford and Cambridge universities, was arranged for an historical tour, the third after the tours in 1948 and in 1956

Matches of the tour

 C.U.B.A.: C. Aldao; C. Salinas, M. Lawson, J. Eiras, J. Pego¬raro; A. Cafferata, G. Elizalde; C.Fontán Balestra, A. Sáenz Valiente, C. Álvarez; C. Teloni, J. Estévez; A. Damas, J. Dumas, E.Gaviña (capt.) 
Oxford-Cambridge: S. Wilson; K, Houston, G. Franckom, D. Rosser, S. Fleming; R. Lamb (capt.), J.
Dorman; J. James, B. Hadman, C. Thorburn; I. Jones, J. Harvey; E. Gould, E. Lloyd, R. Britton.  

Old Georgian Club: D. Morgan; G. Sorzana, D. Bush, G. Ed¬broke, P. Furie; J. Bush, M. Iribarne; D.Ker, A. Dunn, E. Goodliffe; E. Viel Temperley (capt.), J. Lucas; A. Castro, R, Handley, R. Foster
Oxford-Cambridge: S. Wilson; T. Rudd, D. Rosser, R. Hearn, K. Slater; M. Gibson, J. Hamp-Ferguson; B. Hadman, M. Coley, C. Thornburn; I. Jones, F. Craig; K. Webb, B. Reos, E. Gould. 

C. A. San Isidro: J. Lasalle; E. Macadam, M. Lawson, H. Rosati, C. Cornille; M. Beccar Varela, A.Etchegaray; M. Puigdevall, G. Scallan, J. O'Reilly; J. Gerlach, L. Varela (capt.); A Monticelli, N.González del Solar, E. Verardo.
Oxford-Cambridge: R. Lamb (capt.); S. Femming, K. Houston, G. Frankcom, T. Rudd; M. Gibson, J. Dorman; C. Thorburn, B. Hadman, J. James; I. Jones, J. Harvey; R. Britton, B, Reos, K. Webb. 

Córdoba: R. González del Solar; A. Quetglas, L. Rodríguez, N. Astrada, 0. Verde; J. Piuma, J. Del Valle; R. Loyola, P. Demo, J. Ramírez Montroull; J. Masjoan, R. Imas; C. Rivera, A. Paz, J. Coceo.
Oxford-Cambridge: J. Houston; R. Fleming, D. Rosser, P. Frankcom, J. Slater; H. Lamb, J. Hamp-Ferguson; H. James, M. Coley, W. Thorburn; I. Jones, J. Craig; W. Webb, A. Lloyd, H. Gould. 

Argentina B D. Morgan; C. Cornille, J. Benzi, M. Pas¬cual, A. Quetglas; R. Cazenave, A.Etchegaray; J. Ramírez Montroull, H. Silva (capital), J. Imhoff; G. Illia, A. Anthony; W. Aniz, R.
Handley, H. Cresta.
Oxford-Cambridge: S. Wilson; S. Fleming, K. Houston, D. Rosser, T. Rudd; M. Gibson, J. Hamp-Ferguson; C. Thorburn, B. Hadman, J. James; J. Harvey, I. Jones; K. Webb, B. Rees, R. Britton

Rosario:  J. Seaton; E. España (capitán), J. Benzi, E. Ferraza, E. Quetglas; J. Caballero, C. Cristie; M.Paván, J. Imhoff, J. Costante; M. Bouza, M. Chesta; J. Gómez Kenny, R. Seaton, R. Esmendi.
Oxford-Cambridge: S. Wilson; K. Slater, G. Frankcom, D. Rosser, K. Houston; R. .Lamb (capitán), J. Dorman; M. Coley, B. Hadman, A. Herbert; F. Craig, J. Harvey; B. Reos, E. Lloyd, K. Webb. 

Argentina: E. Poggi; E. España, A. Rodríguez Jura¬do, M. Pascual, R. Cazenave; M. Beccar Varela, L. Gradín;E. Scharenberg, H. Silva, R, Loyola; B. Otaño (capitán), L. García Yáñez; G. McCormick, N. González del Solar, R. Foster
Oxford-Cambridge: S. Wilson; T. Rudd, D. Rosser, G. Frankcom, K. Houston; M. Gibson, J. Hamp-Ferguson; J. James B. Hadman, C. Thornburn; I. Jones, F Craig; K. Webb, B. Reos, R. Britton 

Belrano AC : J. Haack; C. Cornille, A. Gómez. Aparicio, Ro¬sati, E. de las Carreras; F Forrester, L.Gradín; R. Schmidt, E. Elowson, F. Caillet-Sois; C. Iribarne, A. Anderson; G. McCormick, G. Luchetti, E. Verardo.
Oxford-Cambridge: K. Houston; S. Fleming, D. Rosser, D. Hearn, K. Slater; R. Lamb, J. Dorman; J. Herbert, M. Coley, J. James; F. Craig, J. Harvey; R. Britton, E. Lloyd, C. Thorburn. 

Argentina: E. Poggi; E. España, A. Rodríguez Ju¬rado. M. Pascual, E. Neri: M, Beccar Varela, L. Gradín; R. Loyola, L. García Yáñez, E, Scharenberg; A Otaño (capitán), A. Anthony; R. Foster, N. González del Solar, G. McCormick.
Oxford-Cambridge: S. Wilson: S. Fleming, K. Houston, G. Frankcom, T. Rudd; M. Gibson, J. Hamp-Ferguson: F. Thorburn, B. Hadman, J. James; F. Craig, I. Jones, Webb, B. Rees, R. Britton. 

Second division XV: J. Ferrer; A. Chiocconi, A. Pagano, J. Vila, H. Houssay; J. Iudice, C. Cullen; M. Ortiz, J. Cornejo Saravia, A. Da Milano; G. Salas, E. Garat; I. Lafuente; C. Massabó, H.Beltrame.
Oxford-Cambridge: M. Gibson; K, Slater, K. Houston, D. Hearn, G. Frankcom; R. Lamb, J. Dorman;C. Thorburn, B. Hadman, J. James; F. Craig, J. Harvey; I. Jones, E. Lloyd, R. Britton.

References 

1965
1965 rugby union tours
1965
1965
rugby
1965–66 in English rugby union
rugby